The Ambassador of the United Kingdom to the Republic of Colombia is the United Kingdom's foremost diplomatic representative in Colombia, and head of the UK's diplomatic mission in Bogotá. The official title is His Britannic Majesty's Ambassador to Colombia.

List of heads of mission

Diplomats to Colombia
1825: John Potter Hamilton and Patrick Campbell Plenipotentiaries
1826–1829: Alexander Cockburn Envoy Extraordinary and Minister Plenipotentiary
1829: James Henderson Consul general in Bogotá
1829–1831: William Turner Envoy Extraordinary

Diplomats to New Granada
1831–1838: William Turner Envoy Extraordinary until 1837; then Envoy Extraordinary and Minister Plenipotentiary
1838–1842: William Pitt Adams Chargé d'Affaires
1841–1843: Robert Steward Chargé d'Affaires
1843–1854: Daniel Florence O'Leary Chargé d'Affaires

Charge d'Affaires and Consul-General to the United States of Colombia
1866–1873: Robert Bunch

Minister Resident and Consul-General to the United States of Colombia
1873–1878: Robert Bunch
1878–1881: Charles Edward Mansfield
1881–1882: Augustus Henry Mounsey
1882–1884: James Plaister Harriss-Gastrell
Mar – Dec 1884: Frederick St John
1885–1892: William Dickson
1892–1897: George Jenner

Minister Resident and Consul-General to the Republic of Colombia

Jul – Nov 1898: Sir Charles Euan-Smith
1898–1906: George Earle Welby
1906–1911: Francis William Stronge

Envoy Extraordinary and Minister Plenipotentiary to the Republic of Colombia
1911–1919: Percy Wyndham
1919–1923: Lord Herbert Hervey
1923–1926: William Seeds
1926–1930: Edmund Monson
1930–1936: Spencer Dickson
1936–1941: Montague Paske-Smith
1941–1944: Thomas Snow

Ambassador Extraordinary and Plenipotentiary to Colombia
1944–1945: Thomas Snow
1945–1947: Philip Broadmead
1947–1953: Gilbert MacKereth
1953–1956: Keith Jopson
1956–1960: James Joint
1960–1964: Stanley Fordham
1964–1966: Sir Edgar Vaughan
1966–1970: William Young
1970–1973: Thomas Rogers
1973–1977: Geoffrey Crossley
1987–1990: Richard Neilson
1990–1994: Sir Keith Morris
1994–1998: Leycester Coltman
1998–2001: Jeremy Thorp
2001–2004: Sir Thomas Duggin
2004–2008: Haydon Warren-Gash
2008–2012: John Dew
2012–2015: Lindsay Croisdale-Appleby

2015–2019: Peter Tibber
2019–: Colin Martin-Reynolds

References

External links
UK and Colombia, gov.uk

Colombia
 
United Kingdom